Jasvinder Sanghera,  (born Derby, England September 1965) is a British author and campaigner against forced marriages and abuse.

Biography
Her memoir Shame was a Times Top 10 Bestseller and described in the House of Lords as a "political weapon". She is widely recognised for publicising the problem of forced marriage. The then Prime Minister, David Cameron, said her work "turned my head on the issue of forced marriage". Her work is recognised as a key contributory factor to the creation of a specific UK forced-marriage criminal offence in 2014.

Sanghera is an expert witness in courts in child, civil and criminal proceedings. She is the Independent Chair of the Leeds Safeguarding Children Partnership and chair of Domestic Homicide Reviews . She is a member of the Safeguarding Panel for the Church of England and has won numerous awards including the “Woman of the Year 2007”. She was granted an honorary doctorate by the University of Derby in 2008. She was awarded The Pride of Britain Award in 2009 and was named Cosmopolitan Ultimate Woman of the Year in 2010. In 2011, she was listed in the Guardian’s top 100 Most Inspirational Women in the World and in 2012 received the Global Punjabi Award. She was awarded Commander of the British Empire in 2013 in recognition of her outstanding contribution for the victims of forced marriage and honour-based abuse and in 2014 was awarded Legal Campaigner of the Year. Sanghera is also listed as an entry in the 2016 edition of the book Who’s Who and in the same year received the International Woman Award for human rights from the Italian media. In 2018 she was awarded Honorary Doctor of Law by De Montfort University, Leicester and Woman of the Year by Leeds City Council and in 2019 she was awarded the Robert Burns Humanitarian of the Year Award and also the Sikh Woman of Substance Award.

Publications
 Shame  (25 January 2007)
 Daughters of Shame  (6 August 2009)
 Shame Travels (2011)

References

External links
 

1965 births
Living people
Commanders of the Order of the British Empire
English people of Indian descent
British activists
British women activists
English memoirists
British Sikhs